Darreh-ye Ali Khani (also Romanized as Darreh-ye ‘Alī Khānī) is a village in Mishan Rural District, Mahvarmilani District, Mamasani County, Fars Province, Iran. At the 2006 census, its population was 41, in 9 families.

References 

Populated places in Mamasani County